Nieczuj  is a village in the administrative district of Gmina Burzenin, within Sieradz County, Łódź Voivodeship, in central Poland.

The village has a population of 107.

References

Nieczuj